Košice–okolie District (okres Košice–okolie) is a district in the Košice Region of eastern Slovakia. It surrounds the city of Košice, which serves as the district seat although it does not belong to the district.

History 

The Košice–okolie district was a part of Great Moravia until the 10th century. After the district fell apart, the area was incorporated into Abaúj and Torna, which were counties of the Kingdom of Hungary.

The region was a part of Abaúj-Torna County from 1882 until the end of World War I. It then became part of the newly formed Czechoslovakia.

Excluding a small section in the north, the district formed a part of Abovsko-turnianská župa of the county of Šariš from 1918 to 1923. From 1923 to 1928, the Košice–okolie district was considered to be a part of Košická župa. From 1923 to 1938, the district was considered to be Slovak land. After the First Vienna Award in 1938, the district was divided between the Kingdom of Hungary and the Slovak Republic, a client state of Nazi Germany. After World War II, the region became known as the district of Košice-vidiek, which is part of Košický kraj. The district of Košice-okolie was established in 1997.

Demographics 

According to the Population and Housing Census, the population in 2011 numbered 119,227. 50.3% of the population is female and 49.7% is male. 20.0% of the population is below the age of 15; 69.5% is between 15 and 65 years of age and 10.5% is 65 or older. The main religious affiliations are Roman Catholic (68.3%), Calvinist (6.3%), Greek Catholic (3.9%) and Evangelical (3.4%).  A further 5.5% are atheists and 11.2% are of unknown religion.

74.0% of the population are considered ethnic Slovak, 9.9% are Hungarian, 6.5% are Romani and 8.5% are of unknown ethnicity.

Municipalities 

Bačkovík
Baška
Belža
Beniakovce
Bidovce
Blažice
Bočiar
Bohdanovce
Boliarov
Budimír
Bukovec
Bunetice
Buzica
Čakanovce
Čaňa
Čečejovce
Cestice
Chorváty
Chrastné
Čižatice
Debraď
Drienovec
Družstevná pri Hornáde
Ďurďošík
Ďurkov
Dvorníky-Včeláre
Geča
Gyňov
Hačava
Háj
Haniska
Herľany
Hodkovce
Hosťovce
Hrašovík
Hýľov
Janík
Jasov
Kalša
Kecerovce
Kecerovský Lipovec
Kechnec
Kokšov-Bakša
Komárovce
Košická Belá
Košická Polianka
Košické Oľšany
Košický Klečenov
Kostoľany nad Hornádom
Kráľovce
Kysak
Malá Ida
Malá Lodina
Medzev
Milhosť
Mokrance
Moldava nad Bodvou
Mudrovce
Nižná Hutka
Nižná Kamenica
Nižná Myšľa
Nižný Čaj
Nižný Klátov
Nižný Lánec
Nová Polhora
Nováčany
Nový Salaš
Obišovce
Olšovany
Opátka
Opiná
Paňovce
Peder
Perín-Chym
Ploské
Poproč
Rákoš
Rankovce
Rešica
Rozhanovce
Rudník
Ruskov
Sady nad Torysou
Šemša
Seňa
Skároš
Slančík
Slanec
Slanská Huta
Slanské Nové Mesto
Sokoľ
Sokoľany
Štós
Strážne (Slovakia)
Svinica
Trebejov
Trsťany
Trstené pri Hornáde
Turňa nad Bodvou
Turnianska Nová Ves
Vajkovce
Valaliky
Veľká Ida
Veľká Lodina
Vtáčkovce
Vyšná Hutka
Vyšná Kamenica
Vyšná Myšľa
Vyšný Čaj
Vyšný Klátov
Vyšný Medzev
Zádiel
Žarnov
Ždaňa
Zlatá Idka

References

Districts of Slovakia
Geography of Košice Region